The Saint Vincent and the Grenadines national netball team represent Saint Vincent and the Grenadines in international netball. As of July 2011, Saint Vincent and the Grenadines are not ranked in the IFNA World Rankings, due to them not playing the required eight matches since July 2009. At the 2003 World Netball Championships in Jamaica, they finished 13th. At their most recent international competition they 11th at the 2006 Commonwealth Games.

See also
 Sport in Saint Vincent and the Grenadines
 Netball in the Americas

References

National netball teams of the Americas
Netball in Saint Vincent and the Grenadines
N